Sociedad Deportiva Flamengo, commonly known just as Flamengo, are an Ecuadorian football team from Latacunga, Cotopaxi province. They are currently competing in the Segunda Categoría.

History
Sociedad Deportiva Flamengo were founded in 1923. The club took inspiration in their name and colors from Clube de Regatas do Flamengo, of Rio de Janeiro, Brazil.

Stadium

Flamengo play their home games at Estadio La Cocha. The stadium has a maximum capacity of 15,000 people.

References

Association football clubs established in 1923
Football clubs in Ecuador
1923 establishments in Ecuador